Kirgizki (Qırğıź) is a rural locality (a village) in Uchpilinsky Selsoviet, Dyurtyulinsky District, Bashkortostan, Russia. The population was 75 as of 2010. There are 2 streets.

Geography 
Kirgizki is located 27 km northeast of Dyurtyuli (the district's administrative centre) by road. Novokangyshevo is the nearest rural locality.

References 

Rural localities in Dyurtyulinsky District